"I'm In It" is a song by American hip hop recording artist Kanye West, from his sixth studio album, Yeezus (2013). It was produced by West, Evian Christ, Dom Solo, Noah Goldstein, Arca and Mike Dean. The song features vocals from Justin Vernon and Assassin and a sample of "Lately" by Kenny Lattimore. In the song, West describes numerous sexual fantasies using very sexually explicit lyrics. The song has received mixed reviews from music critics, with its explicit lyrics receiving the most criticism. Despite charting in the United States in 2013, the song is one of the worst performing songs on Yeezus.

Background
Within the same week of the album's release, a remix of the song was released by DMNDZ. The song was part of West's setlist during the first concert of The Yeezus Tour, performing at the Barclays Center in New York City.

Composition
The song contains very sexually explicit lyrics, in which West describes a sexual night with his wife Kim Kardashian and reflects on living a life of constant sexual arousal. He discusses wanting sweet and sour sauce when he's with an Asian woman, putting his fist in a black woman "like a civil rights sign," and referencing Martin Luther King Jr.'s speech "thank God almighty, we are free at last" speech while referring to unclothing a pair of breasts.

The track includes a chopped and screwed sample of "Lately" by Kenny Lattimore. Anthony Kilhoffer revealed that during the recording sessions for Yeezus, the song started out with a different sample and melody. After West removed the sample, producer Rick Rubin edited the track down from a six-minute arrangement. The song includes additional vocals from Justin Vernon of Bon Iver and Jamaican DJ Assassin. The type of lyrical absurdity shown by West in "I'm In It" was later displayed by him in the 2018 singles "XTCY" and "I Love It" (with Lil Pump).

Release and reception
"I'm In It" was released on June 18, 2013, as the sixth track on West's sixth studio album Yeezus. Since release, the song has received generally mixed reviews from critics, with much criticism regarding its sexually explicit lyrics. Billboard described "I'm In It" as where West "mangles his voice and flips to beast mode". Jon Dolan of Rolling Stone wrote that the song "sounds something like the soundtrack to a snuff film for Cylons," and commented upon the "civil rights sign" lyrics, in which West is described as sounding at once "righteous and evil." Ryan Dombal of Pitchfork described the song as a "XXX creeper" and sounds like "a dancehall orgasm mired in quicksand," effectively making his similar songs, such as "Slow Jamz", come off like a Disney theme song. Ian Kan of Heavy.com found the track one of the weakest on the album, writing "There are some moments when the song feels like it'll pick up, but it doesn't really get there." Sputnikmusic called the track "sexually charged and completely insane" and called its lyrics "completely ridiculous." Of the criticism, West said in a 2013 interview with Jimmy Kimmel: "I'm totally inappropriate sometimes". However, Lou Reed, formerly of the Velvet Underground, described it as West "just having fun" and criticized the negative reaction to its lyrics.

Commercial performance
Upon the release of the album, the track made its debut at number 17 on the US Billboard Bubbling Under Hot 100. It also charted at number 43 on the US Hot R&B/Hip-Hop Songs chart in the same week. It also peaked at number 27 on the US Billboard On-Demand Songs chart the week of July 6, 2013.

Credits and personnel
Credits adapted from the album's liner notes.

 Producer – Kanye West
 Co-producer – Evian Christ and Dom $olo
 Additional production – Noah Goldstein, Arca, and Mike Dean #MWA
 Engineer – Brent Kolatalo, Noah Goldstein, Anthony Kilhoffer, and Mike Dean
 Engineer assisted – Marc Portheau, Khoï Huynh, Raoul Le Pennec, Nabil Essemlani, and Keith Perry
 Mix – Noah Goldstein at Shangri-La Studios, Malibu, CA
 Mix assisted – Sean Oakley, Eric Lynn, Dave "Squirrel" Covell and Josh Smith
 Vocals – Justin Vernon and Assassin

Charts

Notes

References

2013 songs
Dirty rap songs
Kanye West songs
Obscenity controversies in music
Song recordings produced by Kanye West
Song recordings produced by Mike Dean (record producer)
Songs written by Andre Harris
Songs written by Carvin Haggins
Songs written by Jill Scott (singer)
Songs written by Justin Vernon
Songs written by Kanye West
Songs written by Mike Dean (record producer)
Songs written by Vidal Davis